A constitutional referendum was held in Switzerland in July and August 1848 and was the first referendum on record in the Swiss Confederation. The new constitution was approved by 72.8% of voters and a majority of cantons.

Background
In order to pass, any amendments to the constitution needed a double majority; a majority of the popular vote and majority of the cantons. The decision of each canton was based on the vote in that canton. Full cantons counted as one vote, whilst half cantons counted as half.

Results

References

1848 referendums
1848 in Switzerland
1848
Constitutional referendums in Switzerland